Jean-Pierre Wolf  (born July 14, 1960) is a French and Swiss physicist and biophotonics expert and a professor at the Applied Physics Department (GAP) of the University of Geneva.

Education and career 
Wolf was born in Lausanne and studied physics at École Polytechnique Fédérale de Lausanne, where he received his diploma in 1984 and PhD in 1987 under the supervision of Ludger Wöste. He received habilitation from the University of Lyon in 1991.

Research 
His research activities are related with applications of ultrafast spectroscopy for biological, medical, and environmental research. He is working with Jérôme Kasparian on laser beams to control the weather. The technique is similar to cloud seeding, and could potentially influence the triggering and guiding of lightning.

In 2018, he is one of the two winners of the ZEISS Research Award for his research on high intensity lasers and their applications to atmospheric sciences.

Since 2017 his group is taking part into the Consortium of the European project Laser Lighting Rod. The objective of the project is to guide natural lightning using laser filamentation.

References

External links 
Jean-Pierre Wolf 
Laser Weather and Climate Conference
Official CV
Personal website
Interview of GAP Biophotonics leader Prof. Jean-Pierre Wolf on German TV BR Fernsehen

Swiss physicists
Year of birth missing (living people)
Living people
Academic staff of the University of Geneva
École Polytechnique Fédérale de Lausanne alumni
1960 births
People from Lausanne